Michelle Ashford (born 1960) is an American screenwriter and film producer.  She is best known for her Emmy-nominated writing for the 2010 Miniseries The Pacific. In 2013, Ashford's TV series Masters of Sex debuted in the US on Showtime.

Filmography as a writer
 Cat Person - TBA
 Operation Mincemeat - 2022
 Masters of Sex – 2013–16 
 The Pacific – 2010
 John Adams – 2008
 Suburban Shootout – 2008
 Medical Investigation – 2004
 Boomtown – 2002–03
 ATF – 1999
 L.A. Doctors – 1998
 New York News – 1995

Filmography as a producer
 Mayfair Witches – 2023–
 Masters of Sex – 2013–16 
 The Pacific – 2010
 Suburban Shootout – 2008
 Medical Investigation – 2004
 Boomtown – 2002–2003
 ATF – 1999
 L.A. Doctors – 1998
 Michael Hayes – 1997
 New York News – 1995

Personal life
Ashford is married to television writer and producer Greg Walker, who she met while he was working for her. The couple have two children together.

References

External links
 

1960 births
American film producers
Living people
Santa Clara University alumni
American women screenwriters
American women film producers
Place of birth missing (living people)
Showrunners
American women television producers
American women television writers
American television writers
21st-century American women